Extended Versions is a live album that was recorded by the rock group Foreigner on November 26, 2005 at Texas Station in North Las Vegas, Nevada. This is part of a long-running budget live series started by BMG in the late 1990s. The European release contains two more tracks: “That Was Yesterday” and “Blue Morning, Blue Day”.

Track listing
"Head Games" – 5:54
"Cold as Ice" – 5:45
"Waiting for a Girl Like You" – 5:53
"Dirty White Boy" – 4:27
"Starrider" – 6:51
"Feels Like the First Time" – 5:36
"Urgent" – 8:03  
"Juke Box Hero/Whole Lotta Love" – 8:58
"I Want to Know What Love Is" – 6:48  
"Hot Blooded" – 8:18

Featuring
Kelly Hansen        -      Lead Vocals
Mick Jones - Lead Guitar, Backing Vocals, Lead Vocals on "Starrider"
Thom Gimbel         -      Rhythm Guitar, Saxophone, Flute, Backing Vocals
Jeff Jacobs             -      Keyboards, Backing Vocals
Jeff Pilson	 - 	Bass, Backing Vocals
Jason Bonham	 - 	Drums

Foreigner (band) albums
2006 live albums
Live albums recorded in the Las Vegas Valley